Pauline Denise Lecarpentier (born May 1997) is a French freestyle wrestler. She won the silver medal in the women's 68 kg event at the 2022 European Wrestling Championships held in Budapest, Hungary. She won the gold medal in her event at the 2022 Mediterranean Games held in Oran, Algeria.

Career 

In 2018, she finished in 4th place in the women's freestyle 68 kg event at the Mediterranean Games held in Tarragona, Spain.

She won the silver medal in the 62 kg event at the Grand Prix de France Henri Deglane 2019 held in Nice, France. In 2020, she competed in the 76 kg event at the Individual Wrestling World Cup held in Belgrade, Serbia.

In January 2021, she won the silver medal in the 76 kg event at the Grand Prix de France Henri Deglane 2021 held in Nice, France. In March 2021, she competed at the European Qualification Tournament in Budapest, Hungary hoping to qualify for the 2020 Summer Olympics in Tokyo, Japan. In May 2021, she failed to qualify for the Olympics at the World Qualification Tournament held in Sofia, Bulgaria.

She won the silver medal in the 68 kg event at the 2022 Dan Kolov & Nikola Petrov Tournament held in Veliko Tarnovo, Bulgaria. A month later, she also won the silver medal in the 68 kg event at the 2022 European Wrestling Championships held in Budapest, Hungary. A few months later, she won the gold medal in the 68 kg event at the 2022 Mediterranean Games held in Oran, Algeria. She competed in the 68 kg event at the 2022 World Wrestling Championships held in Belgrade, Serbia.

She won the silver medal in her event at the Grand Prix de France Henri Deglane 2023 held in Nice, France. She won one of the bronze medals in her event at the 2023 Grand Prix Zagreb Open held in Zagreb, Croatia.

Achievements

References

External links 
 

Living people
1997 births
Place of birth missing (living people)
French female sport wrestlers
European Wrestling Championships medalists
Competitors at the 2018 Mediterranean Games
Competitors at the 2022 Mediterranean Games
Mediterranean Games gold medalists for France
Mediterranean Games medalists in wrestling
21st-century French women